James Cardinal Gibbons (July 23, 1834 – March 24, 1921) was a senior-ranking American prelate of the Catholic Church who served as apostolic vicar of the Apostolic Vicariate of North Carolina from 1868 to 1872, bishop of the Diocese of Richmond in Virginia from 1872 to 1877, and as ninth archbishop of the Archdiocese of Baltimore in Maryland from 1877 until his death. He was elevated to the rank of cardinal in 1886.

Gibbons was consecrated a bishop on August 16, 1868, at the Baltimore Cathedral. The principal consecrator was Archbishop Martin J. Spalding. He was 34 years of age, serving as the first apostolic vicar of North Carolina. He attended the First Vatican Council in Rome where he voted in favor of defining the dogma of papal infallibility. In 1872, he was named bishop of Richmon by Pope Pius IX. In 1877, Gibbons was appointed archbishop of Baltimore, the premier episcopal see in the United States. During his 44 years as Baltimore's archbishop, Gibbons became one of the most recognizable Catholic figures in the country. He defended the rights of organized labor and helped convince Pope Leo XIII to give his consent to labor unions. In 1886, Gibbons was appointed to the College of Cardinals, becoming the second cardinal in American history, after Cardinal John McCloskey, archbishop of New York.

Early life and education
The fourth of six children, James Gibbons was born on July 23, 1834, in Baltimore, Maryland, to Thomas and Bridget (née Walsh) Gibbons. His parents were from Tourmackeady, County Mayo, in Ireland. The family left Ireland to settle in Canada, but later moved to the United States. 

After contracting tuberculosis in 1839, Thomas moved the family back to Ireland, where he believed the climate would help him recover. Thomas operated a grocery store in Ballinrobe and James Gibborns received his early education there. Thomas died in Ireland in 1847. In 1853, Bridget moved the family to New Orleans, Louisiana.

Gibbons decided to enter the priesthood after attending a sermon given by Paulis Fathers  co-founder, Reverend Clarence A. Walworth. In 1855, Gibbons entered St. Charles College in Ellicott City, Maryland. After graduating from St. Charles in 1857, he went to St. Mary's Seminary in Baltimore, Maryland. He suffered a severe attack of malaria while at St. Mary's, leaving him so debillitated that the staff doubted his ability to handle ordination. Slight of build and a little under than average height, Gibbons suffered throughout his life from gastric problems and consequent periods of anxiety and depression.

Priesthood 
On June 30, 1861, Gibbons was ordained to the priesthood for the Archdiocese of Baltimore by Archbishop Francis Kenrick at the Baltimore Cathedral. He then served as a curate at St. Patrick's Parish in Fells Point in Baltimore for six weeks before becoming the first pastor of St. Brigid's Parish in the Canton section of the city. In addition to his duties at St. Brigid's, he assumed charge of St. Lawrence Parish (now called Our Lady of Good Counsel Parish) in Locust Point, Baltimore. Gibbons served as a  chaplain for Confederate Army prisoners of war at Fort McHenry in Baltimore during the American Civil War.

In 1865, Gibbons was appointed private secretary to Archbishop Martin Spalding. Gibbons helped prepare for the Second Plenary Council of Baltimore in October 1866. At Spalding's prompting, the Council fathers recommended the Vatican created an apostolic vicariate for North Carolina and appoint Gibbons head to it.

Episcopal career

Apostolic Vicar of North Carolina 

On March 3, 1868, Gibbons was appointed as the first apostolic vicar of North Carolina and Titular Bishop of Adramyttium by Pope Pius IX. He received his episcopal consecration on August 15, 1868, from Archbishop Spalding, with Bishops Patrick Lynch and Michael Domenec serving as co-consecrators. The consecrated was celebrated at the Baltimore Cathedral. At age 34, he was one of the youngest Catholic bishops in the world and was known as "the boy bishop."

Gibbons' vicariate, the entire state of North Carolina, contained fewer than 700 Catholics. In his first four weeks in North Carolina, he traveled almost a thousand miles, visiting towns and mission stations and administering the sacraments. He also befriended many Protestants, who greatly outnumbered Catholics in the state, and preached at their churches. Gibbons made a number of converts.  Finding the existing apologetical works to be inadequate for their needs, he determined to write his own; Faith of Our Fathers would prove the most popular apologetical work written by an American Catholic.

Gibbons became a popular American religious figure, gathering crowds for his sermons on diverse topics that could apply to Christianity as a whole. He knew every president from Andrew Johnson to Warren G. Harding and served as an adviser to several of them.

In 1869 and 1870 Gibbons attended the First Vatican Council in Rome. Aged 35 years and 4 months when the Council opened, he was the youngest American bishop present by a mere six days (the second youngest was Jeremiah Francis Shanahan, Bishop of Harrisburg) and the second youngest in all (Basilio Nasser, Melkite Bishop of Baalbek, Lebanon, was more than five years his junior, aged just 30 years and 3 months at opening). Gibbons voted in favor of the doctrine of papal infallibility. He assumed the additional duties of apostolic administrator for the Diocese of Richmond, Virginia, in January 1872.

Bishop of Richmond 
Gibbons was named by Pius IX as the fourth bishop of the Diocese of Richmond on July 30, 1872. He was installed as bishop on October 20, 1872.

Coadjutor Archbishop and Archbishop of Baltimore 
On May 29, 1877, Piux IX named Gibbons as coadjutor archbishop of the Archdiocese of Baltimore. He succeeded as archbishop on October 3, 1877, after the death of Archbishop James Bayley. For the first twenty years of his administration, Gibbons had no auxiliary bishop to assist him. He therefore travelled extensively throughout the archdiocese, coming to know the priests and parishioners very well.

Cardinal Priest 

On June 7, 1886, Pope Leo XIII created Gibbons as a cardinal priest and on March 17, 1887, assigned him the titular church of Santa Maria in Trastevere. He was the second American cardinal after John McCloskey. Gibbons advocated the creation of the Catholic University of America in Washington D.C. and when it was established in 1887, served as its first Chancellor. 

On January 22, 1899, Leo XIII sent Gibbons an encyclical, known by its first words in Latin Testem benevolentiae nostrae ("Concerning New Opinions, Virtue, Nature and Grace, with Regard to Americanism"), condemning what was termed "Americanism". This encyclical was prompted by the preface of the French translation of the biography Life of Isaac Hecker, the founder of the Paulist Fathers in the United States. The Vatican had decided that the preface contained controversial opinions about individualism and liberalism, which the translator, Abbey Félix Klein, had attributed to Hecker. Gibbons and others in the American church hierarchy assured Leo that these were Klein's opinions, not Hecker's, and that Hecker never promoted any deviation from, or minimization of, Catholic doctrines.

In 1903, Gibbons became the first American cardinal to articipate in a papal conclave. He would have participated in the 1914 conclave but he arrived late.

During World War I,  Gibbons was instrumental in the establishment of the National Catholic War Council.  He allowed the newly ordained William A Hemmick to serve American troops in France during the war. Hemmick became known as the patriot priest of Picardy. At the end of the war, Gibbons supported American participation in the new League of Nations. He was initially opposed to the women's suffrage movement in the United States.  However, when the nineteenth amendment to the US Constitution passed in 1920, allowing women to vote, Gibbons urged women to exercise that right, describing it "...not only as a right but as a strict social duty."

James Gibbons died on March 24, 1921, in Baltimore at age 86.

Labor advocate
Gibbons advocated for the protection of working people, an issue of particular concern because he believed many Catholics were being exploited by the industrial expansion of America's urban East Coast at the turn of the century. He was once quoted as saying, "It is the right of laboring classes to protect themselves, and the duty of the whole people to find a remedy against avarice, oppression, and corruption." Gibbons played a key role in the granting of papal permission for Catholics to join labor unions.

Gibbons successfully defended the Knights of Labor, which had a significant Catholic membership, from papal censure, thereby winning a reputation as labor's friend. However, he deplored the concept of class consciousness as outlined in Marxism and condemned industrial violence during labor disputes.

Belgian Controversy 
In early 1904, Congolese activists established the Congo Reform Association in England to protest atrocities and injustices against the people of the Congo Free State, an African state under the direct control of King Leopold II, the Catholic king of Belgium. Congo was scheduled to be discussed in October 1904, at the thirteenth Universal Peace Congress in Boston, Massachusetts. Since the conference organizers had not invited Leopold to send a representative, the Government of Belgim asked Gibbons to help remove Congo from the agenda. Gibbons then wrote a letter to the United Peace Congress organizers, calling it unfair to discuss Congo at the Congress without a representative of Leopold in attendence. 

Gibbons' effort to stop the discussion of Congo at the Univeral Peace Conference failed, only gaining him criticism for his intervention. Gibbons responded "I fear, that this agitation against King Leopold's administration is animated partly by religious jealousy and partly by commercial rivalry." According to the historian John Tracy Ellis, Gibbons was correct that religious jealousy and commercial rivalry played a part in the reform movement in the Congo Free State.  However, Ellis said that the evidence still showed Leopold as being guilty of serious exploitation of the native population. Gibbons had relied too much on the word of the Belgim government and intermittent reports from Catholic missionaries. "For one of the few times in Gibbons' long life, his normally keen judgment went astray and exposed him to the charge of partisanship and of ignorance of the facts governing an issue. The cardinal should have steered clear of the case."A less flattering account of Gibbons' involvement with the Congo Free State is given in author Adam Hochschild’s King Leopold’s Ghost: "[King Leopold’s] representatives in Rome successfully convinced the Vatican that this Catholic king was being set upon by unscrupulous Protestant missionaries. A stream of messages in Latin flowed from the Holy See across the Atlantic to the designated Catholic point-man for Leopold in the United States, James Cardinal Gibbons of Baltimore. Cardinal Gibbons believed that the Congo reform crusade was the work of “only a handful of discontented men... depending largely upon the untrustworthy hearsay of the natives.” Leopold later awarded Gibbons with the Grand Cross of the Order of the Crown. His support of Leopold gained the recognition of Pope Pius X.

Works
Part of Gibbons' popularity derived from the works he authored. Among his widely read works were: Our Christian Heritage (1889), The Ambassador of Christ (1896), Discourses and Sermons (1908), and A Retrospect of Fifty Years (1916). He contributed a number of essays to much-read journals such as the North American Review and Putnams' Monthly. He was also a contributor to the Catholic Encyclopedia. His style was simple but compelling. Protestant Americans looked often to Gibbons for an explanation of the Catholic position on contentious issues.

In 1876, Gibbons published his most famous and highly regarded (even among Protestants) book, The Faith of Our Fathers: A Plain Exposition and Vindication of the Church Founded by Our Lord Jesus Christ .

See also

 Catholic Church in the United States
 Historical list of the Catholic bishops of the United States
 James Cardinal Gibbons Medal
 List of Catholic bishops of the United States
 Lists of patriarchs, archbishops, and bishops
 Papal infallibility

References

Further reading
 Ellis, John T., The Life of James Cardinal Gibbons Archbishop of Baltimore, 1834-1921 (1952)
 Shea, John Gilmary. The Hierarchy of the Catholic Church in the United States, (New York: The Office of Catholic Publications, 1886), 82–84.
 Will, Allen S., Life of Cardinal Gibbons (1922).

External links 

 
 Roman Catholic Archdiocese of Baltimore

Works 
 
 
 
  via Google Books

  via Google Books

 

 

  via Google Books
 Pastoral Letter of 1919
 Gibbons (August 1920): Preface for American Catholics in the war; National Catholic war council, 1917-1921

Biographies
 (in the one‑volume abridgment by Francis L. Broderick)

Movie footage
Conversation with Theodore Roosevelt at Liberty Loan Drive (MPEG 8 mb.)
Another angle on the same event at Sagamore Hill (QuickTime 3mb)

Photographs
James Cardinal Gibbons (Catholic University Archives)
Cardinal Gibbons (Maryland Historical Society)
Cardinal Gibbons Day October 16, 1911 (MHS)
Cardinal Gibbons & Theodore Roosevelt (MHS)
Golden Jubilee Celebration at Basilica of the Assumption (MHS)
Service in progress at Basilica (MHS)
Cardinal Gibbons' Cortege passes Washington Monument (MHS)

1834 births
1921 deaths
19th-century Irish people
19th-century American cardinals
20th-century American cardinals
Roman Catholic archbishops of Baltimore
Roman Catholic bishops of Richmond
American Roman Catholic clergy of Irish descent
Religious leaders from Baltimore
Religious leaders from County Mayo
Roman Catholic Diocese of Raleigh
Catholic University of America people
Pope Leo XIII
Cardinals created by Pope Leo XIII
Burials at the Basilica of the National Shrine of the Assumption of the Blessed Virgin Mary
St. Charles College alumni
St. Mary's Seminary and University alumni
American military chaplains
Contributors to the Catholic Encyclopedia